Wadham Wyndham may refer to:

 Wadham Wyndham (judge) (1609-1668), British judge
 Wadham Wyndham (MP) (1773-1843), British Member of Parliament
 Wadham Wyndham (army officer) (1737-1812), British army officer
 Wadham Wyndham (political supporter) (1793-1849), British political supporter